Dichomeris microdoxa is a moth in the family Gelechiidae. It was described by Edward Meyrick in 1932. It is found on Java in Indonesia.

The larvae feed on Macaranga species.

References

Moths described in 1932
microdoxa